The Mindanao Development Authority (Filipino: Pangasiwaang Pangkaunlaran ng Mindanao, abbreviated MinDA) is a government agency of the Philippines created through Republic Act 9996 or the Mindanao Development Authority Act of 2010. The office is mandated to promote, coordinate and facilitate the active and extensive participation of all sectors to effect socioeconomic development of Mindanao. MinDA is the permanent Philippine Coordinating Office (PCOBE) for the Philippines East ASEAN Growth Area (BIMP-EAGA), that ensures the active participation of Mindanao and Palawan in the sub-regional economic cooperation. The agency is currently chaired by Maria Belen "Mabel" S. Acosta.

Board members

References

External links

Mindanao
Government agencies under the Office of the President of the Philippines